Mindanao Institute is a senior high school in Cabadbaran in the province of Agusan del Norte on the island of Mindanao, Philippines. It provides a general academic education. It was founded in 1946 and is affiliated to the United Church of Christ.

History

The years after World War II ushered in new vision, new dreams and new hopes. Active laymen of the Cabadbaran United Evangelical Church (now United Church of Christ in the Philippines Cabadbaran Chapter) heartily and with their substance supported the move led by the Rev. Angel B. Taglucop, then Moderator of the Eastern Mindanao Conference, to establish a school in Cabadbaran with the following basic objectives:

1. To provide the youth with wisdom towards realistic proficiency and vocational efficiency.

2. To give them strength for enlightened citizenship and dynamic leadership.

3. To imbue them with beauty with creative skill and Christian virtues.

The idea received full support from Rev. and Mrs. Frank Woodward who lent it impetus by moving their missionary residence to Cabadbaran.

Mindanao Institute was born in June 1946 as a non-stock, non-profit Church-related High-School which was recognized by the government under Recognition No. 166, committed to our youth with an enriched general academic curriculum designed to prepare them fully for college yet vocationally able to locate themselves in gainful occupation should circumstances so demand.

The School humbly begun with an initial enrollment of 126 students and by April 1947 graduated 5 students. The residence of Judge and Mrs. Jose R. Villanueva provided the first classrooms, then moved to a larger place in the old Sandigan Building at Magsaysay street, and later transferred to Nipa(Bamboo Structured) Building near the present school which was partly donated and party sold to the United Church of Christ by Mssrs. Celestino Udarbe and Manuel D. Calo. Its first concrete building was constructed in 1948 through 1949 with lumber principally donated by Mr. and Mrs. G.E.C. Mears, of the Nasipit Lumber Company brought to Cabadbaran by the NALCO barges, upon the efforts of the committee composed of Attys. Villanueva, Jongko and Ortega, and Mssrs. Calo and Manuel D. Calo

In 1953, the school suffered a serious crisis, which was solved through placing its administration under the Mindanao Eastern Conference, Composed of the churches in Surigao and Agusan provinces. Through the help of Rev. Taglucop, Dr. Sanders, and Bishop Rodriguez and Lay Representative Virgilio N. Atega Sr., the Executive Committee of the General Assembly of the United Church of Christ in the Philippines granted the school subsidies for the purchase of the lot of Mr. Udarbe, hiring a Bible Teacher, salaries and laboratory supplies and equipment.

The members of the Board of Trustees serve without pay, instead they financially, materially and morally supported the school, and together with the donations from church members, the General Assembly of the United Church of Christ in the Philippines, our patrons, alumni, parents, teachers. Firms and friends, the costs of maintenance of high standard education is made possible. Mindanao Institute offers unlimited honor scholarships, and unlimited work and athletic scholarships. Approximately forty percent (40%) of the costs comes from donations and gifts and subsidies; the rest by the tuition fees.

The secret beyond Mindanao Institute’s success: Grace of God. Today, our dear Alma Mater houses more and more student each school year, continuing its vow to produce High School Students who have shown excellence in various fields while keeping values and moral taught by the institute.

Scholarships
Mindanao Institute offers unlimited honor scholarships, and unlimited work and athletic scholarships.

Finance
Approximately 40% of the costs are met by donations, gifts and subsidies from church members, the General Assembly of the United Church of Christ in the Philippines, the school's patrons, alumni, parents, teachers and others. The remainder of the revenue comes from tuition fees. The members of the Board of Trustees serve without pay.

References

Universities and colleges in Agusan del Norte